KYLT (1340 AM, "1340 KYLT") is a radio station licensed to serve Missoula, Montana.  The station is owned by Townsquare Media and licensed to Townsquare Media, LLC.  It airs a sports format.

The station was assigned the KYLT call letters by the Federal Communications Commission.

Programming
Notable local programming includes the "Berg in the Morning" show for one hour each weekday morning. Notable weekday syndicated programming includes sports talk shows from Fox Sports Radio.

Ownership
In June 2006, KYLT was acquired by Cherry Creek Radio from Fisher Radio Regional Group as part of a 24 station deal with a total reported sale price of $33.3 million.

References

External links
FCC History Cards for KYLT
Cherry Creek Radio

Sports radio stations in the United States
YLT
Radio stations established in 1974
CBS Sports Radio stations
1974 establishments in Montana
Townsquare Media radio stations